The House of Representatives is the lower chamber of Nigeria's bicameral National Assembly. The Senate is the upper chamber.

The House of Representatives has 360 members who are elected in single-member constituencies using the plurality (or first-past-the-post) system. Members serve four-year terms. The Speaker of the Nigerian House of Representatives is the presiding officer of the house.

Nigerian state delegations
The Constitution of the Federal Republic of Nigeria, assumes a National Assembly for the federation which consist of a senate and a House of Representatives. The senate consist of three senate members from each Nigerian state and one senate member from the Federal Capital Territory, Abuja. There must be three hundred and sixty members in total, representing constituencies for the Federal House of Representatives.

Members (since 1979)
Members
List of members of the House of Representatives of Nigeria, 1979–1992
List of members of the House of Representatives of Nigeria, 1992–1998
List of members of the House of Representatives of Nigeria, 1998–1999
List of members of the House of Representatives of Nigeria, 1999–2003
List of members of the House of Representatives of Nigeria, 2003–2007
List of members of the House of Representatives of Nigeria, 2007–2011
List of members of the House of Representatives of Nigeria, 2011–2015
List of members of the House of Representatives of Nigeria, 2015–2019
List of members of the House of Representatives of Nigeria, 2019–2023
Clerks
List of the Clerks of the House of Representatives of Nigeria

Party leaders
Party leaders and whips are elected by their respective parties in a closed-door caucus by secret ballot. With the APC holding a majority of seats and the PDP holding a minority, the current leaders in the 8th National Assembly are: Majority Leader Femi Gbajabiamila, Chief Whip Ado Garba Alhassan, Minority Leader Ogor Okuweh, and Minority Whip Umar Barde Yakubu.

See also
History of Nigeria
Legislative branch
List of national legislatures
Nigerian First Republic
Nigerian Second Republic
Nigerian Third Republic
Nigerian Fourth Republic

References

 
Nigeria
National Assembly (Nigeria)